Daniel Alejandro Pérez Córdova (born 17 January 2002) is a Venezuelan professional footballer who plays as a forward for Club NXT.

Career statistics

Club

Honours
Club Brugge
 Belgian First Division A: 2020–21
 Belgian Super Cup: 2021

References

2002 births
Footballers from Caracas
21st-century Venezuelan people
Living people
Venezuelan footballers
Venezuela youth international footballers
Association football forwards
Venezuelan Primera División players
Belgian Pro League players
Challenger Pro League players
Metropolitanos FC players
Club Brugge KV players
Club NXT players
Venezuelan expatriate footballers
Venezuelan expatriate sportspeople in Belgium
Expatriate footballers in Belgium